Conejo (Spanish for "Rabbit") is an unincorporated community in Fresno County, California.

A post office operated at Conejo from 1898 to 1920.

The San Francisco and San Joaquin Valley Railroad was built through the area in the late 1890s and had a Conejo station.

References

Unincorporated communities in California
Unincorporated communities in Fresno County, California